Prospekt Veteranov (Avenue of Veterans) is a station on the south end of Kirovsko-Vyborgskaya Line of the Saint Petersburg Metro, next to Leninsky Prospekt.

The station was opened on October 5, 1977, along with Leninsky Prospekt. It is located near the beginning of the street of the same name.

This station has no above-ground pavilion. Entrance to the station (like to Leninsky Prospekt) is provided through underground pedestrian crossings, with exits onto Prospekt Veteranov and Dachny Prospekt.  The station's exit does not have escalators either.

The underground hall was constructed as a project of the architect V. G. Khiltchenko and the engineer S. P. Schukin. Memorial style corresponds the name of the station.

The station is remarkable because it is the most crowded metro station in Russia, due to the large part of the city that it serves. Prospekt Veteranov accepts about 200,000 passengers daily.

The station is also used by many as transit when traveling to Peterhof Palace.  Mini-buses (marshrutkas) No. К-343, K-639-б from Prospect Veteranov metro station is one most convenient way to Peterhof.

External links
  Description of the station on Metrowalks.ru

Saint Petersburg Metro stations
Railway stations in Russia opened in 1977
Railway stations located underground in Russia